A kidnapper is a person who performs a kidnapping.

Kidnapper may also refer to:

 Kidnapper (film), a 2010 Singaporean thriller film
 "Kidnapper" (song), by Blondie from the 1978 album Plastic Letters

See also

 Kidnap (disambiguation)
 Kidnapped (disambiguation)
 Kidnapping (disambiguation)